Graham King  is an English film producer. King was nominated four times for the Academy Award for Best Picture for producing the films The Aviator (2004), Hugo (2011), Bohemian Rhapsody (2018), and winning for The Departed (2006).

Career
King is president and CEO of production company GK Films. He is best known for his 2006 crime thriller film  The Departed, which was awarded the Best Picture Oscar at the 79th Academy Awards, and for Bohemian Rhapsody which was nominated for five awards including Best Picture, at the 91st Academy Awards. Bohemian Rhapsody ultimately became the sixth-highest-grossing film of 2018 worldwide, the highest-grossing musical biographical film of all time, and, in 2022 it was listed as one of 20th Century Fox's top ten highest-grossing films.

Honours
King was appointed Officer of the Order of the British Empire (OBE) in the 2010 New Year Honours.

Filmography

References

External links
 GK Films Official website
 
 Graham King: Brit in Holywood Interview
 Graham King in the Film Power 100: the full list

Living people
English film producers
Golden Globe Award-winning producers
Producers who won the Best Picture Academy Award
Officers of the Order of the British Empire
American independent film production company founders
Year of birth missing (living people)